Var Kola (also Romanized as Var Kolā; also known as Varkelū) is a village in Kuhestan Rural District, Kelardasht District, Chalus County, Mazandaran Province, Iran. At the 2006 census, its population was 21, in 5 families.

References 

Populated places in Chalus County